Ishpuini (also Ishpuinis) was king of Urartu. He succeeded his father, Sarduri I, who moved the capital to Tushpa (Van). Ishpuini conquered the Mannaean city of Musasir, which was then made the religious center of the empire. The main temple for the war god Haldi was in Musasir. Ishpuini's kingdom was then attacked by the forces of the Assyrian King Shamshi-Adad V. Ishpuini fought and defeated Shamshi-Adad. Ishpuini was so confident in his power that he began using names meaning everlasting glory, including, "King of the land of Nairi", "Glorious King", and "King of the Universe".

Ishpuini was succeeded by his son, Menua.

See also

 List of kings of Urartu

References

Urartian kings
9th-century BC rulers
810s BC deaths